The Mīqāt Dhu al-Ḥulayfah, also known as Masjid ash-Shajarah or Masjid Dhu al-Hulayfah, is a miqat and mosque in Abyār ʿAlī, Medina, west of Wadi al-'Aqiq, where the final Islamic prophet, Muhammad, entered the state of ihram before performing 'Umrah, after the Treaty of Hudaybiyyah. The mosque is located  SW of the Al-Masjid an-Nabawi and was defined by Muhammad as the miqat for those willing to perform the Hajj or Umrah pilgrimages from Medina. It is the second-largest miqat mosque after the Miqat Qarn al-Manazil in As-Sayl al-Kabir.

History 

Dhu al-Hulayfah was defined as the miqat for the people of Medina by Muhammad in the hadith in Sahih Bukhari, Book 25, Hadith 14, which was narrated by Ibn 'Abbas:"Allah's Messenger (ﷺ) had fixed Dhul Hulaifa as the Miqat for the people of Medina..."The mosque was first built during the time of Umar II ibn 'Abdulaziz, who was the Umayyad governor of Medina from 706-712 (87-93 AH) and has been renovated several times since, the last major renovation being during the reign of King Fahd, who increased the area of the mosque by many times its original size and added several modern facilities.

Architecture 

The current mosque building was built during the reign of King Fahd. It is in the shape of a square of an area of approximately 6,000 square meters (65,000 ft2) inside a 36,000 m2 (388,000 ft2) square-shaped enclosure. It consists of two sets of galleries separated by a wide yard of approximately 1000 square meters (11,000 ft2). The galleries are shaped as arches ending with long domes. At the center of the mosque is spring of water housed inside a dome. The portion of the enclosure that does not include the mosque, measuring around 20,000 m2 (216,000 ft2), includes multiple restrooms and areas for changing into ihram and performing wudu. Most of the inner area is pathways, galleries and trees. All 13 domes are located on the roof of the mosque, while the 5 minarets are located around the enclosure. The mosque is built in an Islamic architectural style, with Mamluk and Byzantine influences.

See also
 List of mosques in Saudi Arabia
 Bayda (land)

References

External links
 A gallery with multiple pictures of the mosque can be found here
 A short introduction to the features of the mosque can be found here
 A 3D virtual tour can be found here

Hajj
Mosque architecture
New Classical architecture
Islamic holy places
Mosques in Medina
Ziyarat
Abdel-Wahed El-Wakil buildings